Douglas Crooks (7 April 1872 – 6 January 1930) was a South African cricketer. He played in three first-class matches for Eastern Province in 1902/03.

See also
 List of Eastern Province representative cricketers

References

External links
 

1872 births
1930 deaths
South African cricketers
Eastern Province cricketers
Cricketers from Port Elizabeth